Aliso Viejo (Spanish for "Old Sycamore") is a city in the San Joaquin Hills of southern Orange County, California. It had a population of 47,823 as of the 2010 census, up from 40,166 as of the 2000 census. It became Orange County's 34th city on July 1, 2001, the only city in Orange County to be incorporated since 2000. It is bordered by the cities of Laguna Beach on the west and southwest, Laguna Hills on the east, Laguna Niguel on the southeast, and Laguna Woods on the north.

History
The Acjachemen are the Indigenous people of Aliso Viejo, who lived in the area for thousands of years. The people established numerous villages along Aliso Creek. With the arrival of settlers, the Acjachemen village sites would later become the southern areas of the Moulton Ranch.

The planned community of Aliso Viejo's original  were once part of the  Moulton Ranch, owned by the Moulton family, who took title in the 1890s to land originally granted to Juan Avila by the Mexican government in 1842.  Over the years, portions of the ranch were sold and became Leisure World, Laguna Hills and Laguna Niguel. 

In 1976, the Mission Viejo Company purchased the remaining 6,600 acres to create a new planned community – Aliso Viejo – with a master plan for 20,000 homes for a planned population of 50,000. The master plan was approved by the Orange County in 1979, and homes were first offered for sale in March 1982. Aliso Viejo's first family moved in that November.

The Aliso Viejo Community Association (AVCA) was set up to manage the local parks and community open space. It was the first community-wide association of its kind in California and has the unique ability to provide a full-range of community services and facilities.

Aliso Viejo was the first planned community in California to plan a balance between the projected resident work force and the number of projected jobs within its borders. Pacific Park, the centrally located  business park and town center, was expected to ultimately provide more than 22,000 jobs. Every home in Aliso Viejo was located within  of Pacific Park, to encourage live-and-work opportunities.

Incorporation
Aliso Viejo had been an unincorporated community since 1979, and incorporated as a city in 2001 due to the efforts of the Aliso Viejo Cityhood 2000 Committee, which was responsible for introducing an initiative on the ballot for the 2001 special election. Voters passed the initiative with 93.3% in favor of incorporation. Carmen Vali-Cave, the co-founder and president of the committee, became the new city's first mayor.

The seal of the city of Aliso Viejo was adopted in 2001 at incorporation. The seal features several mountains, a sunset, a tree, and several buildings. Also, the seal features the slogan "July 2001", in celebration of the city's incorporation date.

African American John Steward: Home Page ,

Board of Director, Division Six, Moulton Niguel Water District; Former Member Compton Unified School District Board of Trustees, is Co-founder/Chief Petitioner to Incorporate the City of Aliso Viejo, CA.

John Steward provided organizational skills and political insights to the formation of the Aliso Viejo Citizen Action League which was the genesis of the Aliso Viejo Cityhood Committee.

Aliso Viejo is a general law city with a council-manager system of government. Day-to-day operations are handled by a professional city manager overseen by a volunteer city council. The City Council of Aliso Viejo consists of five members serving staggered four-year terms. Each year, the Council votes for its next Mayor and Mayor pro tem. The current City Council consists of Mayor Mike Munzing, Mayor Pro-Tem Tiffany Ackley, and Council Members David C. Harrington, Ross Chun, and William Phillips .

State and federal representation

Politics
Aliso Viejo is a swing city at the presidential level. According to the California Secretary of State, as of October 22, 2018, Aliso Viejo has 27,699 registered voters. Of those, 9,210 (33.25%) are registered Republicans, 8,800 (31.77%) are registered Democrats, and 8,388 (30.28%) have declined to state a political party/are independents.

Geography
Aliso Viejo is located at  (33.575096, -117.725431) in the San Joaquin Hills of Orange County. Aliso Viejo is one of several cities bordering Aliso and Wood Canyons Regional Park. Aliso Creek forms part of the city's boundary with Laguna Niguel to the south, and Wood Canyon Creek forms part of the city's western boundary. Much of the city rests on the east slope of the San Joaquin Hills, which are a coastal mountain range extending for about  along the Pacific coast.

Demographics

2020
The 2020 United States Census reported a population of 52,176. The racial makeup was 68.3% White, 2.7% African American, 15.4% Asian, and 18.8% Hispanic or Latino of any race.

2010
The 2010 United States Census reported that Aliso Viejo had a population of 47,823. The racial makeup of Aliso Viejo was 34,437 (89.0%) White (77.8% Non-Hispanic White), 967 (2.0%) African American, 151 (0.1%) Native American, 6,996 (14.6%) Asian, 89 (0.2%) Pacific Islander, 2,446 (5.1%) from other races, and 2,737 (5.7%) from two or more races. Hispanic or Latino of any race were 8,164 persons (17.1%).

The Census reported that 47,354 people (99.0% of the population) lived in households, 450 (0.9%) lived in non-institutionalized group quarters, and 19 (0%) were institutionalized.

There were 18,204 households, out of which 7,095 (39.0%) had children under the age of 18 living in them, 9,358 (51.4%) were opposite-sex married couples living together, 1,966 (10.8%) had a female householder with no husband present, 791 (4.3%) had a male householder with no wife present. There were 987 (5.4%) unmarried opposite-sex partnerships, and 206 (1.1%) same-sex married couples or partnerships. 4,416 households (24.3%) were made up of individuals, and 638 (3.5%) had someone living alone who was 65 years of age or older. The average household size was 2.60.  There were 12,115 families (66.6% of all households); the average family size was 3.16.

The population was spread out, with 12,395 people (25.9%) under the age of 18, 3,739 people (7.8%) aged 18 to 24, 17,138 people (35.8%) aged 25 to 44, 12,003 people (25.1%) aged 45 to 64, and 2,548 people (5.3%) who were 65 years of age or older. The median age was 35.1 years. For every 100 females, there were 92.8 males. For every 100 females age 18 and over, there were 89.2 males.

The homeowner vacancy rate was 1.2%; the rental vacancy rate was 3.6%.  29,819 people (62.4% of the population) lived in owner-occupied housing units and 17,535 people (36.7%) lived in rental housing units.

2000
As of the census of 2000, there were 40,166 people, 16,147 households, and 10,689 families residing in what was, at the time, a Census Designated Place (CDP). The population density was 3,927.7 inhabitants per square mile (1,516.0/km). The racial makeup of the CDP was 78.16% White, 10.99% Asian, 2.06% Black or African American, 0.39% Native American, 0.22% Pacific Islander, 3.51% from other races, and 4.66% from two or more races. 11.65% of the population were Hispanic or Latino of any race.

There were 16,147 households, out of which 37.7% had children under the age of 18 living with them, 52.7% were married couples living together, 10.2% had a female householder with no husband present, and 33.8% were non-families. 23.8% of all households were made up of individuals, and 1.8% had someone living alone who was 65 years of age or older. The average household size was 2.49 and the average family size was 3.01.

The population was distributed with 26.1% under the age of 18, 5.5% from 18 to 24, 48.8% from 25 to 44, 16.3% from 45 to 64, and 3.4% who were 65 years of age or older.  The median age was 33 years. For every 100 females, there were 93.4 males. For every 100 females age 18 and over, there were 91.4 males.

According to a 2007 estimate, the median income for a household in the CDP was $92,280, and the median income for a family was $99,853. Males had a median income of $61,316 versus $44,190 for females. The per capita income for the CDP was $35,244. About 2.3% of families and 2.8% of the population lived below the poverty line, including 3.5% of those under age 18 and 2.8% of those age 65 or over.

Economy

Companies located in Aliso Viejo include:

3tera, a cloud computing software vendor
AND1, a shoe and apparel company
Buy.com, an online retailer
Centon Electronics, Inc., a manufacturer of computer memory and flash-based storage devices
Fluor, an international construction contractor for petrochemical, infrastructure, and environmental projects, headquartered in Aliso Viejo until it was relocated to the Dallas-Fort Worth Metroplex suburb of Irving, Texas in March 2006. Some divisions still reside in Aliso Viejo.
Ketel One, a vodka company
Marie Callender's, a restaurant chain
Microsoft's office after the purchase of DATAllegro
Nimbus Data, a network storage systems and software company
Pacific Life, an insurance company
QLogic, a network storage manufacturer
Quest Software (formerly Dell Software), a software manufacturer
Smith Micro Software, a software developer
Tamiya America, US subsidiary of the manufacturer of model cars Tamiya Corporation, headquartered in Aliso Viejo until it was relocated to Irvine, CA.
UST Global, an IT, Technology and Digital Transformation company
USWeb, an Internet marketing company
Microsemi Corporation, a semiconductor company
Sony Interactive Entertainment, a multinational video game and digital entertainment company
Carbine Studios, a video game developer, partnered with NCSOFT
Metagenics, a medical manufacturing company
Meta Solar, a solar energy installation company
Vertos Medical, a manufacturer of surgical instruments used to perform minimally invasive procedures
Ambry Genetics, a health care genetic lab, a subsidiary of parent company Konica Minolta

Top employers
According to the city's 2016 Comprehensive Annual Financial Report, the top employers in the city are:

Points of interest
 Aliso Viejo Town Center features a movie theater, a wide variety of casual dining restaurants, PetSmart, a Barnes & Noble, a Ralphs supermarket, as well as other shops. The Town Center also includes Grand Park which is a center for community concerts and events.
 The Aliso Viejo Library, a branch of the Orange County Public Library system, opened on January 31, 1998.
 Aliso Viejo Golf Course was designed by Nicklaus Design in 1999 and became the Aliso Viejo Country Club with a redesign in 2005.
 Soka University of America was dedicated on May 3, 2001, with a 103-acre campus and 18 buildings, a $250 million (land and construction) project.
 Soka Performing Arts Center, a 1,000-seat concert hall with acoustics designed by Yasuhisa Toyota (who also designed Walt Disney Concert Hall); opened in September 2011.
 Renaissance ClubSport is a $65 million property which opened in July 2008. It is Marriott's second hotel and fitness resort created in conjunction with Leisure Sports, Inc. (ClubSport) to fulfill the growing demand by local residents and hotel guests for a healthier lifestyle.

Sports teams
 The Orange County Gladiators were an American Basketball Association (ABA) expansion team founded in November 2007 until 2009. They played their home games at Aliso Niguel High School.

Controversy

"Dihydrogen monoxide" incident
Aliso Viejo city officials famously came close to banning polystyrene cups in 2004 after a paralegal working for the city discovered the dhmo.org parody website and learned that they contain "dihydrogen monoxide", failing to realize that this is simply an alternative name for water.

William Freund murder-suicide
In October 2005, the city gained national media attention once again when 19-year-old resident William Freund donned a cape and mask, and murdered two of his neighbors, 22-year-old Christina Smith and her father Vernon, before killing himself. Freund had Asperger syndrome and posted on an Internet message board for people with the disorder, in which he talked of suicide and acts of violence. On November 17, 2006, the family of the two victims sued Freund's parents for "wrongful death and emotional distress." Freund lived with his parents at the time of the shooting and had a history of mental disorders including Asperger syndrome and attention deficit disorder, but the court ruled that Freund's parents were not liable for his actions because he was an adult at the time and the attacks were unforeseen.

School dance ban
In September 2006, Charles Salter, the principal of Aliso Niguel High School, Aliso Viejo's high school, gained widespread media attention when he banned all school dances until further notice. Salter came under fire for his decision. The decision was based on the school's "Welcome Back Dance", at which several students arrived intoxicated, while others engaged in "freak dancing", which Salter views as inappropriate at a school dance. At the end of the month, Salter stood his ground and cancelled the school's annual Homecoming Dance, which gained both Salter and the school notoriety. A story on the school was featured on the national television program, Geraldo at Large and the BBC also covered the dance ban. In late November, it was announced that the dances would return to the school, but under new rules that banned "freak dancing".

Proposed mail distribution center
In 2008–early 2009, Aliso Viejo residents were protesting the United States Postal Service's plan to build a large mail distribution facility. The proposed facility would have up to 500 employees and USPS trucks traveling over residential streets 24 hours per day. Residents were concerned about damage to city streets, traffic and the trucks traveling through city neighborhoods. On March 9, 2009, the USPS announced that it would not move forward with plans to build the distribution facility due to the economic outlook at the time.

Emergency services
Fire protection in Aliso Viejo is provided by the Orange County Fire Authority with ambulance service by Care Ambulance. Law enforcement is provided by the Orange County Sheriff's Department.

Education

Public K–12
The city is served by Capistrano Unified School District, which includes these schools:

Elementary
 Canyon Vista Elementary School
 Don Juan Avila Elementary School
 Oak Grove Elementary School
 Wood Canyon Elementary School

Middle school
Aliso Viejo Middle School
Don Juan Avila Middle School

High school
Aliso Niguel High School

Private K–12
VanDamme Academy
St. Mary and All Angels School 
Aliso Viejo Christian School

Higher education
Saddleback College (Mission Viejo, California)
Irvine Valley College (Irvine, California)
Orange Coast College (Costa Mesa, California)
Soka University of America

Notable natives and residents

 Farzad Bonyadi, professional poker player
 Ryan Coiner, Major League Soccer player for the Columbus Crew
 Ryan Getzlaf, center for the Anaheim Ducks
 Jim Gilchrist, politician and founder of the Minuteman Project
 Kenneth Kizer, CEO and former Secretary of Health in the United States Department of Veterans Affairs
 Ivan Koumaev, contestant on the reality series So You Think You Can Dance
 Royce Lewis, baseball player, first selection of 2017 MLB Draft
 Jason Martin, indie rock musician
 Marc Maiffret, computer security expert/computer hacker
 McKayla Maroney, gymnast, 2012 Olympic champion
 Alex Michelsen, tennis player, 2022 Wimbledon Boys' Doubles champion
 Kyla Ross, gymnast, 2012 Olympic champion
 Toni Turner, author
 Alisa Valdez-Rodriguez, author
 Ashley Wagner, figure skater, 3-time U.S. champion
 Alicia Leigh Willis, actress known for her role as Courtney Matthews on General Hospital

References

External links

Around Aliso Viejo Webshow
OrangeCounty.net City Guide
Orange County Public Library, Aliso Viejo Branch

 
2001 establishments in California
Cities in Orange County, California
Former census-designated places in California
Incorporated cities and towns in California
Populated places established in 2001